The 2014–15 California Golden Bears women's basketball team will represent University of California, Berkeley during the 2014–15 NCAA Division I women's basketball season. The Golden Bears, led by fourth year head coach Lindsay Gottlieb, play their home games at the Haas Pavilion and were a members of the Pac-12 Conference. They finished the season 24–10, 13–5 in Pac-12 play to finish in a tie for third place. They advanced to the championship game of the Pac-12 women's tournament where they lost to their in-state rival Stanford. They received at-large bid to the NCAA women's tournament where they defeated Wichita State in the first round before getting defeated by Texas in the second round.

Roster

Rankings

Schedule

|-
!colspan=9 style="background:#010066; color:#FFCC33;"| Exhibition

|-
!colspan=9 style="background:#010066; color:#FFCC33;"| Non-conference regular season

|-
!colspan=9 style="background:#010066; color:#FFCC33;"| Pac-12 regular season

|-
!colspan=9 style="background:#010066;"|Pac-12 Women's Tournament

|-
!colspan=9 style="background:#010066;"|NCAA Women's Tournament

See also
2014–15 California Golden Bears men's basketball team

References

California Golden Bears women's basketball seasons
California
Golden Bear
Golden Bear